Californites is a genus of the Upper Triassic clydonicoidean family Clionitidae with a discoidal, evolute shell and radial tuberculate ribs that end in strong ventrolateral spines. The whorl section is described as trapezoidal. The venter is low-arched, smooth, and has a strong but narrow median groove.

Californites comes from the Carnian of California.

References

 Treatise on Invertebrate Paleontology, Part L, Ammonoidea. R. C. Moore (ed). Geological Society of America and Univ of Kansas press, 1957

Clydonitaceae
Ceratitida genera